Danielyan, alternative transliterations Danieljan or Danielian, is an Armenian surname, derived from Daniel. Outside of Armenia, it's also prevalent in Russia.

Notable people with this surname include:
 Anushavan Danielyan (born 1956), Prime Minister of the Nagorno-Karabakh Republic
 Artur Danielyan (born 1998), Armenian footballer
 Ashot Danielyan (born 1974), Armenian weightlifter
 Elina Danielian (born 1978), Armenian chess player
 Grigor Danielyan (born 1984), Armenian singer
 Hovhannes Danielyan (born 1987), Armenian boxer
 Leon Danielian (1920–1997), American ballet dancer
 Nelly Danielyan (born 1978), Armenian painter
 Oganes Danielian (1974–2016), Armenian chess player
 Samvel Danielyan (born 1971), Armenian wrestler
 Vahe Danielyan (born 1920), Armenian soldier

References

See also